The 1981–82 UCLA Bruins men's basketball team represented the University of California, Los Angeles in the 1981–82 NCAA Division I men's basketball season.  Larry Farmer was the new head coach, the fourth since the legendary John Wooden. The Bruins started the season ranked 2nd in the nation (AP Poll). On December 19, the Bruins hosted #7 DePaul, winning 87-75. UCLA's team finished 2nd in the Pac-10 regular season and finished 19th in the AP poll.

Starting lineup

Roster

Schedule

|-
!colspan=9 style=|Regular Season

Source

Notes
This UCLA team didn't live up to the pre-season expectations as it was ranked #2 in the AP Poll, but finished ranked only 19th.
For the first time in 16 years (since 1966), UCLA failed to make the NCAA Tournament.

References

UCLA Bruins men's basketball seasons
Ucla
NCAA
NCAA